Jon Bradley Edward Hittle (born 1951) is a historian and author focusing on military and intelligence history of the 19th and 20th centuries. He was born in Iowa and received his B.A. in European History from Briar Cliff University and his M.A. in Modern European Intellectual History and Political Theory from Louisiana State University where his thesis focused on the polemics of Irish Marxist James Connolly. He is a recognized authority on guerrilla warfare, low intensity conflict/asymetrical warfare, counterinsurgency, counterterrorism, counterproliferation and foreign intelligence matters. He has published articles since the 1980s in such journals as Studies In Intelligence and  Proceedings, and he is the author of the book, Michael Collins and the Anglo-Irish War:  Britain's Failed Counterinsurgency, published in 2011. He has served as an historical advisor for television productions, including the popular and longstanding British TV program Who Do You Think You Are? on BBC.

Hittle is a decorated former intelligence officer, having served initially as a military analyst and targeting officer and the balance of his career as a field operations officer. He served in Southeast Asia, Central America, Europe and the Middle East. He also served as an Intelligence Specialist and Maritime Security Team (MST) Boarding Officer in the United States Coast Guard.

Hittle is a recipient of THE NATIONAL INTELLIGENCE MEDAL OF ACHIEVEMENT; THE CIA INTELLIGENCE MEDAL OF MERIT; THE CIA's IRAQ OPERATIONS MEDAL; THE CIA 30 YEARS SERVICE MEDAL; multiple MERITORIOUS SERVICE COMMENDATIONS; THE US COAST GUARD UNIT COMMENDATION and THE NATIONAL DEFENSE SERVICE MEDAL.

References

External links
 Recommended reading

1951 births
Living people
American male non-fiction writers
American military historians
Briar Cliff University alumni
Louisiana State University alumni
People from Sioux City, Iowa
Recipients of the Intelligence Medal of Merit
Writers from Sioux City, Iowa
Historians from Iowa